A list of windmills in the Belgian province of Limburg.

Notes
Bold indicates a mill that is still standing. Italics indicates a mill with some remains surviving.

Buildings and structures in Limburg (Belgium)
Tourist attractions in Limburg (Belgium)
Limburg